Misery.Escape is the fourth full-length album by the Melodic metalcore band The Sorrow. It was released on October, 26th, 2012 through Napalm Records.

Track listing

2012 albums
The Sorrow albums
Napalm Records albums